Typical is a live album by Peter Hammill, recorded in 1992 and released in 1999. It is a double CD and was released on Hammill's own Fie! Records label. The album was recorded at nine concerts in Austria, Germany, the Netherlands and Italy.

Track listing

"My Room" (7:30)
"Curtains" (6:06)
"Just Good Friends" (4:55)
"Too Many of My Yesterdays" (4:23)
"Vision" (4:32)
"Time to Burn" (5:08)
"The Comet, The Course, The Tail" (9:12)
"I Will Find You" (3:55)
"Ophelia" (4:14)
"Given Time" (4:46)
"Modern" (9:30)
"Time for a Change" (4:14)
"Patient" (8:43)
"Stranger Still" (5:51)
"Our Oyster" (5:46)
"Shell" (4:44)
"A Way Out" (9:06)
"Traintime" (6:10)
"The Future" Now (4:03)
"Afterwards" (6:00) (hidden bonus track)
"Darkness (11/11)" (5:13) (hidden bonus track)
"Central Hotel" (6:12) (hidden bonus track)

Personnel
 Peter Hammill – guitar, electric guitar, keyboards, vocals
 Paul Ridout – live mixing, mixing

References

External links
Peter Hammill's notes on Typical

Peter Hammill live albums
1999 live albums